Henry Walker (born 10 March 1998) is an English rugby union player who currently plays for Gloucester in the Premiership Rugby as a hooker.

He first played for Old Shillians RFC at age six. He has represented England U16s and U17s, captained at Bromsgrove School and won trophies in the U13 age group at the Millfield Sevens and the Rosslyn Park tournament. He also represented England U18s in a test series held in South Africa back in 2016.

Walker also represented England U20s in 2017 and earned a selection for the 2018 World Rugby Under 20 Championship. He made his debut for England U20 against Italy in February 2017 

He made his debut for Gloucester against the Barbarians in 62-14 heavy loss held at Kingsholm Stadium in November 2015. On 14 February 2019, Walker signed his first professional contract for Gloucester, this promoted to the senior squad from the 2019–20 season.

References

External links
ESPN Profile
Its Rugby Profile
Ultimate Rugby Profile

1998 births
Living people